Sir Archibald Dennis Flower (31 October 1865 – 23 November 1950) was an English public servant who was Chairman of the Trustees and Guardians of Shakespeare's birthplace and of the Council of the Shakespeare Memorial Theatre.

Early life

Flower was born in 1865, the son of Edgar Flower and his wife, Isabella Sophia. He was the grandson of Edward Fordham Flower. He was educated at Bedford Modern School and Clare College, Cambridge where he took part in the 1886 Boat Race.

Career

Flower was elected to Warwickshire County Council in 1892. In 1900 he became Chairman of the Trustees and Guardians of Shakespeare's birthplace and of the Council of the Shakespeare Memorial Theatre.  He was Mayor of Stratford-upon-Avon 1900–02, 1915–18 and 1931. He was made a Knight Bachelor in 1930.

Family life

Flower married Florence, daughter of Sir Richard Keane, 4th Baronet.  They had two sons and one daughter.  Lady Flower predeceased her husband in 1947. He died three years later at his home in Stratford.

References

1865 births
1950 deaths
People educated at Bedford Modern School
Alumni of Clare College, Cambridge
Cambridge University Boat Club rowers
People associated with Shakespeare
Knights Bachelor